The 1995 Berlin Marathon was the 22nd running of the annual marathon race held in Berlin, Germany, held on 24 September 1995. Kenya's Sammy Lelei won the men's race in 2:07:02 hours, while the women's race was won by home athlete Uta Pippig in 2:25:37.

Results

Men

Women

References 

 Results. Association of Road Racing Statisticians. Retrieved 2020-04-02.

External links 
 Official website
 Photo of Uta Pippig at the finish line

1995 in Berlin
Berlin Marathon
Berlin Marathon
Berlin Marathon
Berlin Marathon